Koen Heldens is a Dutch born mix engineer residing in Miami Florida. Koen started his career in 2003 and rose to prominence in 2017 when he started working with the late XXXTentacion with which he earned a Guinness World Records for most streamed song in a single day for the Billboard Hot 100 #1 single Sad!. Heldens has been nominated for a Grammy Award and has won an American Music Award and a Billboard Music Award. Heldens has worked with Kanye West, Maluma, Trippie Redd, Swae Lee, Khea, Lit Killah, Dalex, Don Toliver, Lil Wayne, Rick Ross, Tory Lanez, Kid Ink, Elley Duhé, Lil Pump, Lil Yachty, Rico Nasty, Vybz Kartel, Ky-Mani Marley, Stefflon Don and Ski Mask The Slump God.

Discography Highlights

Singles Mixed

Other charted songs
{| class="wikitable plainrowheaders" style="text-align:center;"
|+ List of songs as mixer, with selected chart positions and certifications, showing year released, performing artists and album name
! scope="col" rowspan="2" style="width:18em;" | Title
! scope="col" rowspan="2" | Year
! scope="col" colspan="3" | Peak chart positions
! scope="col" rowspan="2" style="width:12em;" | Certifications
! scope="col" rowspan="2" | Album
|-
! scope="col" style="width:3em;font-size:90%;"| US
! scope="col" style="width:3em;font-size:90%;"| USR&B
! scope="col" style="width:3em;font-size:90%;"| USRap
|-
! scope="row"| "Whoa (Mind In Awe)"XXXTentacion
|rowspan="4"|2018
| 37 || 3 || — 
| 
 United States (RIAA): Platinum
|rowspan="4"|Skins (XXXTentacion album)
|-
! scope="row"| "I Don't Let Go"XXXTentacion
| 51 || 17 || 22 
|
 United States (RIAA): Gold
|-
! scope="row"| "One Minute (ft. Kanye West & Travis Barker"XXXTentacion
| 62 || — || 23
| 
|-
! scope="row"| "Staring At The Sky"XXXTentacion
| 68 || — || 12
|
|-

Awards and nominations

Guinness World Records
{|class="wikitable sortable"
|-
! Publication
! Country
! Song
! Record
|-
| Guinness World Records
| style="text-align:center;"| World Wide
| XXXTentacion “Sad!”
| Most Streamed Song in a Single Day
|-

Grammy Awards

!
|-
|2020
| Spider-Man: Into the Spider-Verse (soundtrack)
| 62nd Annual Grammy Awards Grammy Award for Best Compilation Soundtrack for Visual Media
|
|rowspan="1"|

American Music Awards

!
|-
|2018
| 17 (XXXTentacion Album) (as mixer)
| Favorite Album – Soul/R&B
|
|rowspan="1"|
|-
|2019
| Spider-Man: Into the Spider-Verse (soundtrack)(as mixer)
| American Music Award for Top Soundtrack
|
|rowspan="1"|

Billboard Music Awards

!
|-
|2018
| 17 (XXXTentacion Album) (as mixer)
| Top Album – R&B
|
|rowspan="1"|
|-
|rowspan="6"|2019
| Spider-Man: Into the Spider-Verse (soundtrack) (as mixer)
| Top Soundtrack
|
|rowspan="6"|
|-
| ? (XXXTentacion album) (as mixer)
| Top 200 Album
|
|-
| ? (XXXTentacion album) (as mixer)
| Top Rap Album
|
|-
| 17 (XXXTentacion album) (as mixer)
| Top R&B Album
|
|-
| Sad! (as mixer)
| Top Streaming Song (audio)
|
|-
| Sad! (as mixer)
| Top Streaming Song (video)
|
|-

BET Hip-Hop Awards

!
|-
|2019
| YBN: The Mixtape (as mixer)
| BET Hop-Hop Award for Best Mixtape
|
|rowspan="1"|

NAACP Image Awards

!
|-
|2019
| Spider-Man: Into the Spider-Verse (soundtrack) (as mixer)
| 50th NAACP Image Award for Outstanding Soundtrack/ Compilation
|
|rowspan="1"|

See also
Mixing Engineer
Audio mixing

External links
http://www.mixedbykoenheldens.com/
https://genius.com/artists/Koen-heldens
https://credits.muso.ai/profile/7a329c5c-a33b-46fa-9778-ffc11fd96ed2/credits
https://www.allmusic.com/artist/koen-heldens-mn0003695847

References

Dutch audio engineers
People from Venray
Living people
Dutch musicians
1986 births